"Pray" is a song by Belgian electronic music trio Lasgo, which is also a track on their debut album, Some Things. The song was released in 2002 as the third single, after "Something" and "Alone". It peaked inside the top 20 in several countries. In Spain, "Pray" reached number eight and became the band's only top-1 hit.

Music video
The music video was uploaded to Lasgo's official YouTube channel on 1 September 2007. The video features the band driving and sailing across the country with one member filming on an old camera. There is a saturated filter on the video.

Charts

Weekly charts

Year-end charts

References

2001 songs
2002 singles
Capitol Records singles
Eurodance songs
Lasgo songs
Positiva Records singles
Songs written by Peter Luts